The Bungdang refers to political factionalism that was characteristic of the middle and late Joseon dynasty. Throughout the dynasty, various regional and ideological factions struggled for dominance in the political system. Village Seowon, which combined the functions of Confucian shrines with educational institutions, often reflected the factional alignment of the local elite.

During the earlier period of Joseon in 15th and 16th century, tension between the Hungu faction in the Capital and the Yeongnam-based Sarim faction dominated national politics, which culminated in a series of four bloody purges between 1498 and 1545, in which Sarim faction was persecuted by the Hungu faction. Following these setbacks, the Sarim faction withdrew to rural provinces where they maintained power base and ideological continuity through Seowon and Hyang'yak (a system of social contract that gave local autonomy to villages). Eventually, the Hungu faction declined without an ideological successor while the Sarim faction emerged as the dominant faction during the reign of Seonjo.

In the 16th century, a nationwide split occurred within the Sarim faction between the Western faction (Seo-in) and Eastern faction (Dong-in), composed mainly of younger generation. Political divisions intensified even further as the Eastern faction in turn split between the hard-line Northern faction (Buk-in) and the moderate Southern faction (Nam-in) and the Western factions split between the Old Learning (No-ron) and the Young Learning (So-ron), these four factions sometimes known as sasaek ("four colors"). The Northern faction further split into the Greater Northern and Smaller Northern factions. The faction names often derived from the relative location of their leader's house.

These factional splits grew out of allegiance to different philosophical schools and regional differences. For instance, the Eastern faction was largely Youngnam-based, and its subfaction the Southerners were mainly followers of Yi Hwang while the Northerners coalesced around the school of Jo Shik. The Gyeonggi and Chungcheong-based Western faction were largely followers of Yi I, of which followers of Seong Hon split to form the So-ron faction and Song Siyeol's followers became the No-ron faction. These divisions were often further driven by questions concerning royal succession or appropriate royal conduct. For example, the split between the Northerners and Southerners was driven by debate over the proper successor to Seonjo, who had no legitimate son. The Northerners came to support the Gwanghaegun; accordingly, they flourished under his reign (1608–1623) but were swept from power by the Westerners after the succession of Injo.

Under the reigns of Yeongjo and Jeongjo in the 18th century, a strict policy of equality was pursued with no faction being favoured over another. However, in Jeongjo's reign, strife re-emerged as the ruling No-ron faction split further between the Byeokpa and Sipa, two groups which cut across the earlier factions and differed in their attitudes concerning Yeongjo's murder of his son, who was also Jeongjo's father. In the 19th century, Joseon politics shifted as in-law families rather than scholarly factions came to dominate the throne. For most of the 19th century, the Jangdong branch of the Andong Kim clan was in control of the government; however, there was a brief interlude in which control shifted to the Pungyang Cho clan.

During the reign of Gojong, real power initially belonged to his father the Heungseon Daewongun, who on one hand sought to reform corrupt state institutions but on the other hand pursued a policy of isolationism, opposing the opening of the country to Western and Japanese influences. From the 1870s onwards, Queen Min (known posthumously as Empress Myeongseong) became more dominant and pursued a policy of cautious modernisation and opening up. Her dominance was opposed by reactionaries and progressives alike. The Enlightenment Party (also known as Progressives) sought to modernise the country along Western and Japanese lines. These factional struggles led to the Imo Incident and Gapsin Coup, as well as increased foreign interference in Korean affairs.

Factions of Sarim

Philosophical Lineage
Yi Saek --> Jeong Mong-ju --> Gil Jae --> Kim Suk-ja --> Kim Jong-jik (Youngnam Sarim) --> Kim Gueng-pil --> Jo Gwang-jo (Giho Sarim)
Youngnam School: Yi Hwang --> Seoung Hon, Yu Seong-ryong, Kim Seong-il
Giho School: Yi I -> Kim Jan-seng --> --> Song Siyeol
Jo Shik --> Kim Hyo-won, Jeong In-hong, Gwak Jaeu
Seo Gyeong-deok --> Heo Gyun, Hwang Jin-i

Division of Sarim
Sarim --> 
Eastern (Youngnam School) -->
Southern (Yi Hwang)
Northern (Jo Shik) -->
Greater Northern
Lesser Northern
Western (Giho School) -->
No-ron (Yi I)
So-ron (Seong Hon)

Political leaders
Easterners: Kim Hyo-won (his house was on eastern side)
Hong Yeo-sun, Heo Gyun
Lesser Northern: Nam Yi-gong, Kim Seon-guk
Southern: Woo Seong-jeon (his house was below South Mountain), Yu Seong-ryong -->
 Heo Mok, Yoon Hyu -->
  Jeong Yak-yong
Westerners: Shim Eui-gyeum (his house was on western side)
No-ron: Song Siyeol
So-ron: Han Tae-dong, Yoon Jeung

Portrayal in media
In the Korean drama Yi San in 2007, the Noron party is portrayed as the King Jeongjo's chief enemy and the antagonist in the series. It made his father, Crown Prince Sado, die while fallen from grace and tried to shame or kill his son, Yi San (known later as King Jeongjo), throughout his life and reign, while the Soron and Namin parties are mentioned in the dialogue. The series also portrays the split within the Noron faction during his reign and implied that it was a contributing factor to its political defeat.

See also
Neo-Confucianism in Korea
History of Korea
Joseon Dynasty politics

References

Bibliography 
 

Joseon dynasty